The Marauders is a 1947 American Western film directed by George Archainbaud and written by Charles Belden. The film stars William Boyd, Andy Clyde, Rand Brooks, Ian Wolfe, Dorinda Clifton and Mary Newton. The film was released on July 1, 1947 by United Artists. The on-screen title is King of the Range, with an on-screen subtitle (Formerly "The Marauders").

Plot
Hoping to aid the few remaining residents, Hoppy, California and Lucky investigate a ghost town that has been purchased dirt cheap by an unknown woman.

Cast 
 William Boyd as Hopalong Cassidy
 Andy Clyde as California Carlson
 Rand Brooks as Lucky Jenkins
 Ian Wolfe as Deacon Black
 Dorinda Clifton as Susan Crowell
 Mary Newton as Mrs. Crowell
 Harry Cording as Riker
 Earle Hodgins as Clerk Tom
 Richard Bailey as Oil Drille

References

External links 
 
 
 
 

1947 films
American black-and-white films
Films directed by George Archainbaud
United Artists films
American Western (genre) films
1947 Western (genre) films
Hopalong Cassidy films
1940s English-language films
1940s American films